The Lyappa (or Ljappa) arm, officially Automatic system of re-docking, was a robotic arm used during the assembly of the Soviet/Russian space station Mir. Each of the Kvant-2, Kristall, Spektr and Priroda modules was equipped with one of these arms, which, after the module had docked to the Mir Core Module's forward (or axial) port, grappled one of two fixtures positioned on the core module's hub module. The  module's main docking probe was then retracted, and the arm raised the module so that it could be pivoted 90 degrees for docking to one of the four radial docking ports.

Likewise the Prichal module will host the grapple fixtures for the redocking of future modules docked to it from one port to another using the Lyappa Arm attached to those modules, if needed.

Both the Wentian and Mengtian modules of the planned Tiangong space station will also carry arms to enable them to manoeuvre around the docking hub of the Tianhe core module. A mechanical arm dubbed the Indexing robotic arm, which looks similar to the Lyappa arm, will be the arm on the modules to allow them to dock to a radial port of the CCM. It is different from Lyappa as it works on a different mechanism. Lyappa arm is needed to control the pitch of the spacecraft and redocking in a different plane. But the indexing robot arm where docking is needed in the same plane. In addition to this arm used for docking relocation, the Chinarm on Tianhe module can also be used as a backup.

Naming
The word “Lyappa” does not exist in Russian.

Gallery

References

Further reading
Industrial Robotic Arm Manufacturing
 

Mir
Spacecraft docking systems
Articulated robotics
Robotic manipulators